Mazdaznan is a neo-Zoroastrian religion which held that the Earth should be restored to a garden where humanity can cooperate and converse with God. Founded at the end of the 19th century by Otoman Zar-Adusht Ha'nish, born Otto Hanisch, the religion was a revival of 6th century Mazdakism. Adherents maintained vegetarian diets and practiced breathing exercises. Concerned with the nature of thought, emotion and behavior, Mazdaznan taught that the practical aspects of personal health could be achieved through conscious breathing, "Gah-Llama". The word Mazdaznan is said to derive from the Persian "Mazda" and "Znan", and is supposed to mean "master thought".

Teachings

Although the movement originally consisted of public lectures and group exercise, popular demand made a book called The Power of Breath available. This book propelled Mazdaznan into being promoted as a dietary (vegetarian) movement with breathing, bowel and glandular exercises for physical, spiritual and mental development.

Its lack of lasting popularity can be attributed to the fact that besides emphasizing the importance of the individual decision, it proclaims personal responsibility for one's own fortune. Its success as a word of mouth movement that spawned similar groups can be attributed to its "tried and true" traditions of how different physical postures and ways of breathing produce predictable and controllable mental states.

Its relationship to Judeo-Christian and other religions can be deduced from its emphasis upon three historical characters: Ainyahita, Zarathustra and Jehoshua. Ainyahita, daughter of the divinely created couple (may be related to Anahita), lived 9000 years ago and is supposed to be the origin of the white Aryan race, which includes the Jews and therefore Jesus of Nazareth. The traditional God character of most religions has its Mazdaznan  component in "Gah-Llama" which is referred to as "intelligence," and "In the air you breathe." The Power of Breath discusses Gah-Llama in breathing exercises, where the main goal is self-control and mastery of your body through, effectively, "breathing intelligently" and breathing "intelligence" or "Gah-Llama". It is in all respects a non-theistic tradition, in that all words for the unknown are recognized as linguistic and semantic peculiarities, with no rules except for suggestions for health, which are accompanied with a note that you know what's best for yourself.

Movement 
The first centers were established in Chicago in 1890 and New York in 1902. Since 1917, Hanisch settled mainly in  Los Angeles, California. Several scholars brought his teachings to other countries.

In Europe, Mazdaznan was spread by the former Californian farmers David and Frieda Ammann beginning in about 1907. David Ammann was expelled from Leipzig, Germany in 1914 due to the publication of the book Inner Studies. The main centre for Mazdaznan in Europe was the Lebensschule at Herrliberg near Zurich. One of the most famous European followers of the movement was the abstract painter Johannes Itten, who taught at the Bauhaus, who insisted on shaven heads, crimson robes and colonic irrigation.

In the 1930s, Gloria Gasque, a wealthy follower of the movement, went to Bombay intending to restore the "true" message of Zoroaster to the Parsis. Though met with hostility, she remained there for a number of years before she returned to the United States.

The Nazis proscribed Mazdaznan from 1935, a ban that remained in Germany until 1946. Today the movement has several thousand German followers.

In 1980 Mazdaznan's headquarters moved to Encinitas, California, and in 2001 the last manager of the headquarters disappeared and the organized movement ceased to exist in the US, though it is possible that there are still isolated followers or practitioners in the US.

In 2007, the movement was revived in Canada by Peter deBoer.

Literature
Hanish, Otoman Zar-Adusht: Inner Studies: A Course of Twelve Lessons, 1902
Hanish, Otoman Zar-Adusht: Ainyahita in Pearls (articles 1907–1909)
Hanish, Otoman Zar-Adusht: Mazdaznan Dietetics and Cookery Book, 1913
Hanish, Otoman Zar-Adusht: Mazdaznan Health and Breath Culture, 1914
Hanish, Otoman Zar-Adusht: Jehoshua the Nazir, (describes mystical eastern sources on Jesus of Nazareth).
Hanish, Otoman Zar-Adusht: Ever Creative Thought, 1931

Notes

New religious movements
Religions that require vegetarianism
Neo-Zoroastrianism